Paultons Park is an amusement park located in the New Forest National Park, near the village of Ower, in Hampshire, England, with over 70 rides and attractions. The Peppa Pig World themed area is based on the children's animated television series Peppa Pig. The Lost Kingdom themed area includes 27 animatronic dinosaurs. The park name is derived from the former Paultons Estate, on which the park is situated. The park covers 140 acres of land and features a collection of around 80 species of birds and animals, in addition to the rides. Most of the theme park rides are designed for children and families, which is why the park considers itself a family theme park. The nearest railway station is Totton which is 5.64 km away from the attraction.

History

Estate and house
The park is located on land on the Paulton's Estate. In 1269 the land was in the possession of the Abbot of Glastonbury, who sold it to John de Palton. The estate has since been named after him. The land then passed down to John Touchet, who in 1497 led a rebellion against King Henry VII; Touchet was defeated, beheaded and his lands confiscated by the crown. The lands left royal ownership in 1547, when the newly crowned King Edward VI gave the estate to John Paulet. This continued until 1780 when Hans Sloane inherited the estate from Hans Stanley, who changed his name to Hans Sloane Stanley as a sign of gratitude. The estate, now covering , was modelled and designed by Capability Brown in the 18th century.

Around 1945 the house was converted to a hotel. This use came to an end in 1954. The house was destroyed by fire in 1963. 

In 1979, John and Anne Mancey (parents of the current director, Richard Mancey) bought the derelict 500-acres Paultons Estate, restored the gardens and lake to their former glory and opened a fun park. Four years later, in 1983, Paultons Park opened as a country park and bird garden.

1983–1999
The theme park opened as Paultons Park and Bird Gardens on 17 May 1983. The park covered , with four staff members and attractions featuring only an adventure playground, the Village Life Museum located in a converted barn, and the numerous birds and animals.

Three years after the launch, the attractions were expanded with the Railway Station, Station Tea Rooms and Rio Grande Railway being constructed, alongside the Magic Forest, Kids Kingdom and Captain Blood's Cavern. 1988 saw the Land of the Dinosaurs, the Rabbit Ride and the Trampolines being completed, with the Astroglide and Crazy Snooker added the following year. The Bumper Boats attraction was added in 1990 alongside a Pets Corner area, with a maze with large clock at the centre added for 1991 and the Flying Saucer ride installed in 1992.

In 1993, the Runaway Train roller coaster was installed, becoming the park's first major ride. It was accompanied by a mirror maze and the Sky Diver the following year and allowed visitors to break the 400,000 mark in 1995. In 1996, the Tiny Tots playground was constructed along with a walkthrough tableaux entitled The Wonderful World of Wind in the Willows, following the story of the same name. The year also saw the introduction of Santa's Wonderland, an event in every festive season to this day.

In 1997, the Tea Cup Ride became another popular addition to the park, and the following year the Percy's Play Park play area and the Go-Karts were constructed, with the latter providing older children with an attraction.

1999–2009
In 1999, the park began expanding, with a new ride built most years since. In 1999, this was the Raging River Ride, the largest ride at the time and costing £500,000. For the new millennium, the Runaway Train ride was dismantled and replaced with the Stinger roller coaster. The Runaway Train was relocated to Dunes Leisure Park in Lincolnshire.

2001 saw three new rides added to the park: The Pirate Ship, Viking Boats and the Dragon Ride, which replaced the Crazy Karts ride located on the same area. In recent years, the rides had become more focused on attracting older audiences, and so to compensate two rides were built for 2002 solely for children under seven: The Digger Ride and Seal Falls. Two rides were constructed in 2003 – the Wave Runner entertained thrill seekers, while The Flying Frog catered for children by being the younger version of the Stinger.

2004 saw two drop rides installed; Jumping Jack for younger audiences and the taller Jumping Bean for older visitors. The Bumper Boats ride was removed and replaced with a penguin enclosure on the same site, as well as an upgrade in the animal areas. The Kontiki ride was built in 2005, with the Magic Carpet built on the site of the Wirly Copters ride the same year.

In 2006, the park was expanded when Paultons in the previous season of 2005, construction started at a cost of £2million on the custom made Cobra. The coaster is built on land unused before by the park and to house a new, bigger roller coaster: the Cobra. This later became a difficulty for the park due to the lands status and legal rights, however, action only began in 2009. Paultons had shifted its ride investment towards the older visitor market, and to compensate opened the Trekking Tractors ride in 2007, in which children could see growing in progress with farming machinery around. The Crazy Snooker, Crazy Golf and Panning for Gold attractions, were removed, and replaced by Gold Rush Falls, consisting of new and re-themed Crazy Golf and Panning for Gold attractions.

2008 saw the 25th anniversary of the park. As a result, a traditional style ride was installed: The Sky Swinger, and the entrance plaza was remodelled. As the new ride would be built on the site of the clock maze, the clock was transported to the entrance plaza to become the centrepiece of a new side garden. However, the most striking part of the new plaza is a Kugel ball added to celebrate the anniversary. It is the largest in the UK, at 1.5 metres diameter and weighing 6.5 tonnes.

Soon after the anniversary, the park undertook a major rebranding project in which the logo was changed, the previous slogan "It's a Hoot! Hoot!" was dropped and the owl mascot was seen less.

The park's expansion continued in 2009 with the addition of The Edge ride, located next to the Cobra on land not used until Cobra opening in March 2006, and of the Water Kingdom, replacing the Kids Kingdom play area. However, the park was told they may have to move the Cobra and Edge after an application to grant them retrospective planning permission was narrowly turned down by the national park planning committee by seven votes to five. The area where these rides were situated is designated 'Country Park' and not 'Amusement Park' in planning terms, whereas all other areas of the park are now recognised as an amusement park and therefore have permitted development rights. After a separate application for the Cobra was made it was announced on 22 December 2009 that the ride had now been granted retrospective permission and could remain in its current location.

Another planning application was lodged with the New Forest National Park Planning Authority to retain the Edge ride. This application received public support and Paultons were granted permission by the New Forest NPA to retain the Edge ride in its current location on 16 March 2010.

2010–2019
No new rides were opened in 2010, instead, all efforts were put into 2011's new opening: Peppa Pig World. This features three large rides and several more smaller rides and attractions all contained within a themed area. This is the world's first Peppa Pig theme park. The area also includes the largest Peppa Pig toy shop in the world selling Peppa Pig themed merchandise. This new development was heavily promoted through the Internet, television and radio adverts. The area opened on 6 April 2011 and visitor numbers to the park increased from 500,000 per year to 1 million after the year of opening.

In 2012 the park opened a new drop and twist 25m tower ride called Magma. A volcano theme surrounds the ride and there is an animatronic dinosaur inside the mountain where the queue line is. Smoke and rumbling sound effects occur when the ride moves up out of the volcano.

In 2013 the park opened a 4D cinema showing "Curse of Skull Rock" which replaced the Village Life Museum and as part of a 1950 New Orleans-themed area called Show Street.

In 2014, the park began demolishing its old entrance to make way for a new gateway building consisting of the Big Toy Shop and Wildwoods restaurant. New Admissions and Guest Information kiosks were also built as part of the development. The park also added a new ride, a Victorian Double Decker Carousel, as well as that a new footpath was constructed along the main entrance.

In 2015, the park began a rebranding of various areas of the park. The area surrounding the Stinger and Wind in the Willows attractions was named Critter Creek and themed around the discovery of a number of whimsical animals and plants by Professor Stanley Blast. The Stinger was renamed Cat-O-Pillar to reflect its new half-cat-half-caterpillar theme, and Wind in the Willows was replaced by Beastie Burrow, a live insect and amphibian exhibit. A new miniature train ride called Professor Blast's Expedition express was also installed. A four-acre area encompassing the Rabbit Ride, Astroglide, Land of the Dinosaurs and Kiddies Play Village was also cleared in order to begin development of the Lost Kingdom, a dinosaur-themed land due for completion in spring 2016.

On 17 May 2016 the park opened Lost Kingdom – a dinosaur-themed park land suitable for younger and older children aged 6–12. The land cost £9 million to build and is home to 8 new rides and attractions including: Flight of Pterosaur, a Vekoma family suspended coaster, Velociraptor, a Vekoma family boomerang coaster, Temple Heights Zamperla magic carpet, Dino Chase, a Zierer Tivoli junior coaster, Boulder Dash, a Zamperla demolition derby ride, Meteallbau Emmeln, track ride, Alive – a dinosaur meet and greet character experience and the Little Explorers play ground.

A new discovery trail also opened on 17 May 2016 to encourage native species from the New Forest to reside. This includes interactive boards along the route and over 40 bird and bat boxes.

In January 2017 Paultons announced on the Peppa Pig World website that a new project had started to make Peppa Pig World "Bigger and Better". The statement on the website simply stated  "New Attractions Under Construction". This was later revealed to be a new water ride, new monorail-ride and an expansion to the pedestrian areas. Park signage states that the attractions are to open in spring 2018.

At the start of the 2018 winter season, a new animal area named "Little Africa" opened next to Peppa Pig world. This features a walk-through aviary, nocturnal house and several new animal enclosures. At the same time, the Jumping Bean and Jumping Jack rides were retired and removed.

2020s
It was announced that Tornado Springs, a western-themed area, would be installed for 2020. There are 8 rides in this area including a Mack Rides spinning coaster, which is located next to the Buffalo Falls water ride, which has received an overhaul. In April 2020, the park announced that the opening of the new area and its attractions would be delayed until 2021, in light of the ongoing COVID-19 pandemic that had halted all work with contractors and placing the park's operating season in jeopardy. The Farmyard Flyer junior coaster opened in April 2022 as part of Tornado Springs. 

In November 2021, Peppa Pig World was mentioned by British Prime Minister Boris Johnson in a speech given to the Confederation of British Industry. Johnson revealed that he had previously visited the theme park with his wife and their children, and referred to it as "very much my kind of place". The following month opposition leader Keir Starmer confirmed that he too had visited Peppa Pig World - “it’s dreadful," he said.

Rides and attractions 
Paultons Park is split into various themed areas, composing of rides and attractions for the whole family to enjoy.

Tornado Springs

Lost Kingdom

Critter Creek

Peppa Pig World

Main Park

Former Attractions

Future Attractions

Lost Kingdom Water Ride 2024 
A new water ride will be 'splashing into the Lost Kingdom' for the 2024 season to replace the removed Temple Heights ride. Rumored to be a Hafema rapids or flume ride.

Certificate of Lawfulness 
Paultons Park have submitted an application to confirm the lawful use of land to the west of existing attractions Cobra and The Edge as 'amusement park', indicating a future attraction is planned for this area.

Animals

Little Africa- home to African birds including turacos, Cape teal, white-faced whistling ducks and guineafowl.
Meerkat Manor-  an enclosure including indoor and outdoor areas for meerkats.
Penguin Pool-  Humboldt penguins in a pool with underwater viewing areas, housed in the former bumper boat pool. There are feeding sessions with keepers daily.
Birds of Prey-  including the great grey owl. 
Hornbills- a large hornbill collection including silver-cheeked, black-casqued wattled, trumpeter, Von der Deckens and red-billed hornbills.Tropical Birds- including laughing thrush, Spreo and starlings.
Flamingos and Pelicans in enclosures.
Tortoises-  including Aldabra tortoises that arrived at the park in 1995.

Gardens 

The Main Garden located on the site of Paultons House, which no longer remains.
Lake & Weir – horseshoe-shaped lake fed by a tributary of the River Test.
Tropical Plants including a Wollemi pine which was thought to be extinct until discovered in Australia in 1994.
Rockery – parts of the old cellars of the original Paultons house that have been retained.
Spring Garden with snowdrops and drifts of yellow daffodils in the spring.
Rhododendrons and Azaleas blooming in late spring.
Trekking Tractor Garden – a farm garden created in the middle of a ride with a vegetable plot.Donoughmore Cross monument situated on the far side of the lake marks the site of what was once a pets' cemetery.
Jungle Falls – African-themed Jungle Falls Garden, with a topiary elephant, giraffe and crocodile.Snakes and Ladders Garden with a large cobra made from 5000 Sedums.
Anne and John's Garden – opened in 2008 as part of the entrance plaza, enhanced in 2015 with the addition of a glass fountain 7 history of Paultons digital screens.The Floating Globe – a kugel ball which is also part of the entrance plaza developed for the 2008 season, it is the largest of its type in the UK, weighing over 6 tonnes and 1.5 metres in diameter.
Water Wheel – a genuine Victorian Brestshot waterwheel which drives a sawmill and was part of the original Paultons Estate (the land on which the park is now situated).

Planning permission issues
In 2009, Paultons Park were told they may have to move two of their biggest rides (The Cobra and Edge) after an application to grant them retrospective planning permission was turned down by the national park planning committee by seven votes to five. The area where these rides were situated is designated 'Country Park' and not 'Amusement Park' in planning terms, whereas all other areas of the park are now recognised as an amusement park and therefore have permitted development rights.

After a separate application (for the Cobra only) was made it was announced on 22 December 2009 that The Cobra (The park's biggest ride) had now been granted retrospective permission and could remain in its current location.

Another planning application was lodged with the New Forest National Park Planning Authority to retain the Edge ride. The application received public support and Paultons were granted permission by the New Forest NPA to retain the Edge ride in its current location on 16 March 2010.

Awards

 Visit England Gold Accolade 2022
 TripAdvisor Travellers Choice Award - No.1 Theme Park in the UK, No.8 in Europe and No.24 in the World
 TripAdvisor Travellers Choice Award – No. 1 Theme Park in the UK and No.11 in Europe 2017
 TripAdvisor Travellers Choice Award – No. 1 Theme Park in the UK and No.6 in Europe 2016
 TripAdvisor Travellers Choice Award – No. 2 Theme Park in the UK and No.6 in Europe 2015
 TripAdvisor Travellers Choice Award – No. 1 Theme Park in the UK 2014
 TripAdvisor Certificate of Excellence 2015
 TripAdvisor Certificate of Excellence 2013
 Netmums Best UK Theme Park for Family Fun 2013
 Netmums Best UK Theme Park for Pre-Schoolers 2013
 Netmums Best UK Theme Park Kids Favourite Category 2013

References

External links

 
 Official Peppa Pig World site
 Official Lost Kingdom site
 Official Peppa Pig site
 Paultons Park news

Animal theme parks
Amusement parks in England
Tourist attractions in Hampshire
Animatronic attractions
Mazes
Gardens by Capability Brown
1983 establishments in England
Amusement parks opened in 1983
Romsey